Matteo Malucelli (born 20 October 1993) is an Italian cyclist, who currently rides for UCI ProTeam .

Major results

2015
 1st Stage 3 Rás Tailteann
 1st Stage 10 Volta a Portugal
 3rd Circuito del Porto
 6th Trofej Umag
2016
 Tour du Maroc
1st Points classification
1st Stages 3, 4 & 6
 1st Stage 1 Okolo Slovenska
 8th GP Kranj
2017
 Tour of Bihor
1st Points classification
1st Stages 1 & 3
 1st Stage 2 Okolo Slovenska
2018
 Vuelta al Táchira
1st Stages 1 & 3
 1st Stage 2 Vuelta a Aragón
 1st Stage 2 Tour de Bretagne
 1st Stage 1 Tour of Bihor
 1st Stage 1 Vuelta a Venezuela
 1st Stage 1 Tour of China I
2019
 1st  Points classification, Tour Poitou-Charentes en Nouvelle-Aquitaine
2021
 1st Stage 1 Vuelta al Táchira
 10th Cholet-Pays de la Loire
2022
 1st Stage 1 Tour of Antalya
 1st Stage 1 Giro di Sicilia

References

External links

1993 births
Living people
Italian male cyclists
People from Forlì
Cyclists from Emilia-Romagna
Sportspeople from the Province of Forlì-Cesena